Mundy Park at , is the largest park in Coquitlam, British Columbia. The park has many walking trails that pass the park's two lakes - Mundy Lake and Lost Lake. There are also sports fields, a lacrosse box, an outdoor swimming pool, disc golf area, picnic area, and playground.

The Coquitlam Reds of the B.C. Premier Baseball League play their home games at Mundy Park.

Scenes from the 2006 Danny DeVito/Matthew Broderick film Deck the Halls were shot at Mundy Park.

There a wide variety of wildlife in Mundy Park, including black bears, deer, raccoons, ducks, geese, swans, and a large variety of other birds. Some endangered plants are also to be found at Mundy Park.

Mundy Park was originally named
Munday Park after George Munday, who originally bought the land. The reason for the changed name is unknown.

References

Parks in Coquitlam
Sports venues in Coquitlam
Baseball venues in British Columbia